E.S. Cox may refer to:
Earnest Sevier Cox (1880–1966), American Methodist preacher and racist
 Ernest Stewart Cox (1900–1992), British railway engineer and author